The 2014 NCAA Division I Football Championship Game was a postseason college football game between the North Dakota State Bison and the Towson Tigers. It was played on January 4, 2014, at Toyota Stadium in Frisco, Texas. The culminating game of the 2013 NCAA Division I FCS football season, it was won by North Dakota State, 35–7.

With sponsorship by Northwestern Mutual, the game was officially known as the NCAA FCS Championship presented by Northwestern Mutual. This was the third consecutive championship for North Dakota State.

Teams
The participants of the Championship Game were the finalists of the 2013 FCS Playoffs, which began with a 24-team bracket. This was the first tournament with 24 teams in the field; it had been 20 teams for the prior three postseasons.

North Dakota State Bison

North Dakota State finished their regular season with an 11–0 record (8–0 in conference), including a season-opening win over Kansas State of the FBS. As the first-seed in the tournament, the Bison defeated Furman, Coastal Carolina, and New Hampshire to reach the final. This was North Dakota State's third appearance in an FCS/Division I-AA title game, having won the prior two title games. This was the final game for Craig Bohl as head coach of the Bison, as he had accepted on offer to take the same role with Wyoming.

Towson Tigers

Towson finished their regular season with a 10–2 record (6–2 in conference), including a season-opening win over Connecticut of the FBS. As the seventh-seed in the tournament, the Tigers defeated Fordham, second-seed Eastern Illinois, and third-seed Eastern Washington to reach the final. This was Towson's first appearance in an FCS/Division I-AA championship game.

Game summary
The teams traded touchdowns in the first quarter. In the second quarter, the Bison returned a blocked field goal 59 yards, then scored on the next play to go ahead, 14–7. The Tigers were held scoreless for the remainder of the game, as the Bison won by a 35–7 final score. The Bison became the second team in FCS/Division I-AA history to win three consecutive titles, joining Appalachian State (2005–2007).

Scoring summary

Game statistics

References

Further reading

External links
 Box score at ESPN
 2013 FCS National Championship: North Dakota State vs Towson via YouTube

Championship Game
NCAA Division I Football Championship Games
North Dakota State Bison football games
Towson Tigers football games
American football in the Dallas–Fort Worth metroplex
Sports in Frisco, Texas
NCAA Division I FCS Football Championship Game
NCAA Division I FCS Football Championship Game